Shurab Rural District is a rural district (dehestan) in the Central District of Arsanjan County, Fars Province, Iran. At the 2006 census, its population was 8,279, in 1,829 families.  The rural district has 27 villages.

References 

Rural Districts of Fars Province
Arsanjan County